The Canadian Institute of Chartered Accountants (CICA) was incorporated by an Act of the Parliament of Canada in 1902, which later became known as the Canadian Institute of Chartered Accountants Act.

The CICA developed and supported accounting, auditing and assurance standards for organizations in Canada, developed and delivered education programs, and issued the professional designation of Chartered Accountant. The CICA was a founding member of the International Federation of Accountants and the Global Accounting Alliance.

In 2014, CICA merged with Canada's two other major accounting designations to form the Chartered Professional Accountants of Canada.

History
 1902 – The Dominion Association of Chartered Accountants (DACA) is incorporated by Private Act of the Parliament of Canada. (SC 1902, c. 58)
 1934 – The Canada Companies Act is amended to provide for the involvement of the DACA in setting standards for accounting policies.
 1938 – All provinces agree that membership should be determined by a Uniform Evaluation.
 1951 – DACA changes its name to the Canadian Institute of Chartered Accountants. (SC 1951, c. 89)
 1954 – Students in all provinces in Canada are writing the same examination.
 1968 – The CICA releases the CICA Handbook, which codifies Canadian GAAP.
 1972 – The Canadian Securities Administrators rule that provincial securities commissions must consider the CICA Handbook as the basis for Canadian GAAP.
 1975 – The CICA Handbook is incorporated by reference into the Canada Business Corporations Act for specifying the basis of Canadian GAAP.
 1990 – Act of incorporation is updated to reflect the current mandate and powers. (SC 1990, c. 52)
 2008 – The CICA announces that Canadian GAAP will converge with International Financial Reporting Standards for publicly accountable enterprises, effective with reporting periods beginning on or after 1 January 2011.
 2004 - The CICA begins merger talks with CMA Canada, but talks do not go beyond the exploratory stage.
 2011 - Merger talks are renewed, this time including CGA Canada, to create a new national accounting body. Over the next three years member organizations in all provinces agree to merge, forming Chartered Professional Accountants of Canada.

Qualification as a member
CAs are admitted to the profession through their Provincial Institutes/Ordre. These bodies are responsible for establishing and administering the qualification process, admission criteria and performance standards within their jurisdictions.

Pre-qualification education is delivered regionally through one of four systems across Canada:

The CICA's role – in concert with all provinces, territories – is to develop and maintain consistent, uniform standards for the profession's qualification process. These standards ensure the portability of the CA designation across Canada and internationally through various mutual recognition agreements.

Admission to the CA profession requires:

 A university degree.
 Specified university courses or the equivalent.
 Completion of a professional pre-qualification program as noted above.
 Prescribed practical experience with approved training offices, which are set in place in accredited CA firms, offices of provincial or national Auditors General, and selected corporations and government organizations.
 A passing grade in the Uniform Evaluation.

Foreign trained accountants
The CICA itself does not admit members and students; its membership is derived from membership in one of the 10 provincial and two territorial institutes of chartered accountants and the Institute of Chartered Accountants of Bermuda.   The institutes are empowered by local laws to regulate and govern the chartered accountancy profession within their jurisdictions. Individuals holding foreign accountancy designations who want to become a Canadian Chartered Accountant must apply to the institute in the jurisdiction where they live or intend to live.

The CICA works in partnership with and on behalf of the institutes to:

 Assess the qualification processes of foreign accounting bodies to determine the extent to which they are equivalent to the Canadian process
 Negotiate Mutual Recognition Agreements with accounting bodies whose qualification processes are substantially equivalent;
 Determine the additional education, evaluation and experience requirements for members of reviewed accounting bodies not deemed substantially equivalent.

Credentials of foreign-trained accountants are assessed according to the following categories:

Assessments of foreign bodies, and negotiations of Mutual Recognition agreements are conducted by the profession's International Qualifications Appraisal Board (IQAB), the current status of which is as follows:

See also
 Canadian accounting profession
 Accounting Standards Board (Canada)
 International Qualification Examination
 Uniform Evaluation

Member institutes

References

Canadian accounting associations
Auditing organizations
Member bodies of the International Federation of Accountants